Radekan or Radkan may refer to:

Radkan, Golestan
Radekan, Qazvin
Radkan, Razavi Khorasan
Radkan Rural District, in Razavi Khorasan Province